Ludwików may refer to the following places:
Ludwików, Bełchatów County in Łódź Voivodeship (central Poland)
Ludwików, Piotrków County in Łódź Voivodeship (central Poland)
Ludwików, Radomsko County in Łódź Voivodeship (central Poland)
Ludwików, Skierniewice County in Łódź Voivodeship (central Poland)
Ludwików, Łęczna County in Lublin Voivodeship (east Poland)
Ludwików, Opole Lubelskie County in Lublin Voivodeship (east Poland)
Ludwików, Białobrzegi County in Masovian Voivodeship (east-central Poland)
Ludwików, Grójec County in Masovian Voivodeship (east-central Poland)
Ludwików, Lipsko County in Masovian Voivodeship (east-central Poland)
Ludwików, Piaseczno County in Masovian Voivodeship (east-central Poland)
Ludwików, Gmina Gąbin in Masovian Voivodeship (east-central Poland)
Ludwików, Gmina Łąck in Masovian Voivodeship (east-central Poland)
Ludwików, Radom County in Masovian Voivodeship (east-central Poland)
Ludwików, Gmina Rybno in Masovian Voivodeship (east-central Poland)
Ludwików, Gmina Teresin in Masovian Voivodeship (east-central Poland)
Ludwików, Konin County in Greater Poland Voivodeship (west-central Poland)
Ludwików, Ostrów Wielkopolski County in Greater Poland Voivodeship (west-central Poland)